Wet Lake may refer to two lakes in Poland:
 Wet Lake (Warmia-Masuria Voivodeship)
 Wet Lake (Kuyavia-Pomerania Voivodeship)